The Clark Bridge is a cable-stayed bridge across the Mississippi River between West Alton, Missouri and Alton, Illinois.  Named after explorer William Clark like the bridge it replaced, the cable-stayed bridge opened in 1994.  It carries U.S. Route 67 across the river.  It is the northernmost river crossing in the St. Louis metropolitan area.

The new $85 million,  replaced the old Clark Bridge, which was only .  The truss bridge was built in 1928.  The new bridge carries two lanes of divided traffic in each direction, as well as two bike lanes.  The old bridge carried only two lanes (similar to the upstream Champ Clark Bridge).

The bridge is sometimes referred to as the Super Bridge. Its construction was featured in a NOVA documentary entitled Super Bridge, which highlighted the challenges of building the bridge, especially during the Great Flood of 1993. Designed by Hanson Engineers under contract to Illinois Department of Transportation (DOT), the Clark Bridge was the first in the United States in which "such a light steel-framed cable-stayed design was combined with a cable saddle type of pylon".

See also
List of crossings of the Upper Mississippi River
Lewis Bridge

Gallery

References

External links

 
David Goodyear and Ralph Salamie, "The Clark Bridge", from Civil Engineering, August 1994
"Super Bridge", PBS, Companion page for NOVA episode
"Super Bridge", PBS Nova episode, replay of full episode on Archive.org

Cable-stayed bridges in the United States
Bridges over the Mississippi River
Bridges in Greater St. Louis
Bridges in St. Charles County, Missouri
Bridges in Madison County, Illinois
Alton, Illinois
Bridges completed in 1994
Bridges of the United States Numbered Highway System
Road bridges in Illinois
Road bridges in Missouri
U.S. Route 67
Steel bridges in the United States
Concrete bridges in the United States
1994 establishments in Illinois
1994 establishments in Missouri
Interstate vehicle bridges in the United States